The Pakistan cricket team toured New Zealand in November and December 2009 for a three-match Test series.

Squads
Pakistan: Mohammad Yousuf (c), Kamran Akmal (v.c), Abdur Rauf, Danish Kaneria, Faisal Iqbal, Fawad Alam, Imran Farhat, Khurram Manzoor, Mohammad Aamer, Mohammad Asif, Saeed Ajmal, Salman Butt, Sarfraz Ahmed(wk), Shoaib Malik, Umar Akmal, Umar Gul, Yasir Arafat.

New Zealand: Daniel Vettori (C), Shane Bond, Grant Elliott, Daniel Flynn, Peter Fulton, Martin Guptill, Brendon McCullum, Tim McIntosh, Chris Martin, Iain O'Brien, Jeetan Patel, Ross Taylor, Daryl Tuffey.

Tour Matches

Test series

1st Test

2nd Test

3rd Test

Notes
The Umpire Decision Review System (UDRS) which became official from 1 October 2009 was used for the first time during this series. The UDRS allows players to challenge the umpire's decisions for a specific number of times per innings.

Media coverage

Television
SKY Sport (live) – New Zealand
Sky Sports (live) – European Countries
Fox Sports (live) – Australia
Neo Cricket (live) – India, Pakistan
Supersport (live) – South Africa

References

2009 in Pakistani cricket
2009 in New Zealand cricket
2009–10 New Zealand cricket season
New Zealand
2009